The official world records in the 5000 metres are held by Joshua Cheptegei with 12:35.36 for men and Letesenbet Gidey with 14:06.62 for women.

The first world record in the men's 5000 m was recognized by World Athletics (formerly called the International Association of Athletics Federations, or IAAF) in 1912. As of January 2014, 35 world records have been ratified by World Athletics in the event.

The first world record in the women's 5000 m was recognized by the IAAF in 1981. As of January 2014, 13 world records have been ratified by the IAAF in the event. Before the event was recognised by the IAAF as an official world record event, the 3000 metres was the most common international women's long-distance track event. However, women did sometimes compete over 5000 m before its addition to the World Championships and Olympic programme in 1995 and 1996, respectively.

Men

Pre-World Athletics

World Athletics era 

Auto times to the hundredth of a second were accepted by the IAAF for events up to and including 10,000m from 1981. Dick Quax's 13:12.9 from 1977 was recorded as 13:12.87 to the hundredth of a second.

Women

Pre-recognition

World Athletics world records

References

World athletics record progressions
World record
Articles which contain graphical timelines